This is a list of notable Cambodian Americans, including both original immigrants who obtained American citizenship and their American descendants.

To be included in this list, the person must have a Wikipedia article showing they are Cambodian American or must have references showing they are Cambodian American and are notable.

List

Francois Chau - actor; known for his role as Dr. Pierre Chang in Lost
Monirith Chhea - visual artist originally from Phnom Penh
Arn Chorn-Pond - musician and human rights activist
Bhante Dharmawara - Buddhist monk and teacher; helped resettle thousands of Cambodian refugees in the US; founded the first Cambodian Buddhist temple in the US
Maya Gilliss-Chapman - founder and CEO of Cambodians in Tech, Miss Cambodian American, 2nd Runner Up
Elizabeth Heng - politician, candidate for California's 16th congressional district in 2018
Vanna Howard - politician, first Cambodian American woman elected to the Massachusetts state legislature (17th Middlesex District)
Soben Huon - Miss Utah USA 2006; Miss USA competitor
Jessa Khan - martial artist/sportsperson
SreyRam Kuy - first female Cambodian refugee to become a surgeon in the United States; former Chief Medical Officer for Medicaid for the state of Louisiana; former Deputy Under Secretary for Health for Community Care, United States Department of Veterans Affairs
Yasmin Lee - LGBT pornographic actress
Kalyanee Mam - filmmaker
Laura Mam - musician and music industry entrepreneur.
Sam Meas - first Cambodian-American congressional candidate
Ros Mey - Buddhist monk and survivor of the Khmer Rouge regime, head monk of Wat Thormikaram in Providence, Rhode Island
Rady Mom - politician, first Cambodian American elected to the Massachusetts state legislature (18th Middlesex District)
Sochua Mu - politician, democracy and women's rights activist  
Chhom Nimol - lead vocalist for the band Dengue Fever.
Haing S. Ngor (1940-1996) - Oscar-winning actor for his performance in the movie The Killing Fields; author, physician
Ted Ngoy - "Doughnut King," entrepreneur and politician
Soma Norodom - Princess of Cambodia, journalist and author
Chanthou Oeur - painter and sculptor
Monty Oum - visual artist, designer, and animator, of Cambodian and Vietnamese descent
Pisay Pao - actress
Sopheap Pich - sculptor and visual artist
Chath PierSath - poet, painter, and humanitarian
Dith Pran (1942-2008) - portrayed in the movie The Killing Fields; photojournalist for The New York Times; human rights activist
San Kim Sean - martial artist
Sophiline Cheam Shapiro - choreographer and dance teacher
Sichan Siv - former U.S. Ambassador to the United Nations Economic and Social Council and the author of Golden Bones
Anthony Veasna So - writer
Pou Sohtireak - politician
Loung Ung - author, speaker, Khmer Rouge survivor and activist against landmines
Jordan Windle - Olympic diver
Chhun Yasith - political activist, received life sentence for attempting a coup
Nite Yun - chef and restaurateur.

Naturalized
Angelina Jolie - American actress, maintains dual Cambodian and American citizenship, given Cambodian citizenship in 2005

References

Cambodian

Cambodian